Fantasia is a traditional exhibition of horsemanship in Somaliland and the Maghreb performed during cultural festivals and for Maghrebi wedding celebrations. It is present in Algeria, Libya, Mali, Mauritania, Morocco, Niger and Tunisia. It is attested in the ancient Numidian times during which it was practiced by the Numidian cavalry. Historian Carlos Henriques Pereira stated that the North African fantasia also called barud is a modern watered down version of a Numidian military technique.

Fantasia is considered a cultural performance and a form of martial art; it also symbolizes a strong relationship between the man (or woman) and the horse, as well as an attachment to tradition.
According to Jean-Pierre Digard, it is a watered down version of the Numidian cavalry charge.

Fantasia performances usually take place during local seasonal, cultural or religious festivals, also called موسم moussem "saint's day festival" in Maghrebi Arabic.

History of the performance 

Fantasia has been attested in the ancient times during which it was practised by the Numidians, historian Carlos Henriques Pereira stated that the modern North African fantasia is a watered down version of a Numidian military technique. Fantasia has also been traced back to Arab-Amazigh tribes in the 17th century.
Tbourida comes from the cavalry charge performed by an army's vanguard in battle. It was also used in cavalry raiding and celebrations.

Name 
The horse is referred to as a fantasia horse and is of Arabian, Andalusian or Barb stock. The term “fantasia” is of Latin origin, meaning “entertainment”, or Spanish- Italian meaning “fantasy”. Fantasia is also a name used by French Orientalists. The Arabic term mawsim literally means "season". There are also regional names for the sport, such as Tbourida in Morocco, the word comes from the Arabic Baroud, meaning gunpowder. The term laâb el-baroud and laâb el-khayl are also used in Arabic.

Fantasia in art
Some French, Sri Lankan and other Western artists have done oil paintings of the fantasia, including Edmon Vales, Eugène Delacroix, Nasreddine Dinet, Théo van Rysselberghe, Amiru K. Eugène Fromentin and Ulpiano Checa.

Fantasia in Algeria 
In Algeria the Fantasia goes back to the Numidian period. Fantasia is common in Algeria, there are frequent regional Fantasia festivals and cultural events. Popular festivals include the Sidi Yahia Bensafia d'Ouled N'hare in Tlemcen, the Sidi Ahmed Almadjoub festival in Naâma and Horse festival in Tiaret. Fantasia is also performed around the Annual Pilgrimage of Sidi Cheikh. According to the Algerian Equestrian Federation, 350 traditional equestrian associations, spread across the whole of the national territory, perpetuate the Fantasia.

The Fantasia in Algeria is usually performed on a delimited ground of more than one hundred meters long, either in groups made up of nine to eleven riders or individually. The aim is to showcase skill, speed, rifle firing display, traditional dress, as well as the horses and their harnesses.

The collective or group Fantasia is classified into two categories of games: the Temerad and the Guelba. In both games, the riders travel from one extremity of the course to the other and then execute the three stages of the Fantasia on their way back. A group leader is responsible for coordinating the performance by signalling, in the form of cries, the start of each stage.

In the Temerad game, the riders approach the other end of the course at a walk, make a U-turn and await the signal from the group leader. At the start cry, the riders start galloping in a single line. At the second cry, the riders stand up, aligned shoulder to shoulder, holding the rifles in aim. At the third cry, the riders deliver a single blast by firing their arms simultaneously and then continuing the ride without leaving the course until they reach the end in an orderly and calm manner.

In the Guelba game, the riders approach the other end of the course at a trot. The first cry signal is given as soon as they reach it, at which point, they make an extremely fast U-turn and start galloping. Those who fall behind must catch up at even higher speed for the alignment of the second stage. Although the last two stages are more or less similar to the Temerad, the speed at which the first stage is performed makes the Guelba the most accident prone of the two.

The individual Fantasia, which can include up to three riders, is performed mostly in eastern Algeria. Always galloping from the start, the rider simulates an attack, and after firing, which can be done with one or two rifles successively, the rider then simulates a sabre attack. The game with two riders involves the two riders galloping at the start, holding each other tightly, boot to boot, sometimes going so far as to entwine the arm of one on the shoulders of the other, giving the impression from afar that it is only a single rider. After the volley, the two riders separate and finish the course with a sabre attack display.

Local artists such as the painter Rachid Talbi and the photographer Nadjib Rahmani have produced artwork featuring the Fantasia in Algeria.

Fantasia in Morocco (Tbourida) 

There are frequent Tbourida festivals (moussems) and cultural events in Morocco. Tbourida is also performed during national holidays and agricultural events.

The performance consists of an odd number of horse riders, all wearing traditional clothes, usually carrying a copy of the Quran and a sword, who charge along a straight track called Mahrak, at the same speed so as to form a line, and then at the end of the charge (about two hundred meters) fire into the sky using old muskets or muzzle-loading rifles. The difficulty of the performance is in synchronizing the movement of the horses during acceleration of the charge, and especially in firing the guns simultaneously so that one single shot is heard. The horses were bred from the Arabian and Barb breeds or a mixture of the two. The riders are led by a Mokaddem in the center of the troupe, usually a more experienced rider, who coordinates the rest of the troupe's movements. A Tbourida show consists of two parts, the Hadda and the Talqa.

The SOREC was created in 2003 as a public enterprise under the Ministry of Agriculture and Fisheries to promote and preserve the practice of Fantasia and Tbourida in Morocco, according to the SOREC, there are about a thousand registered Fantasia troupes. Fantasia troupes are also represented by the Royal Moroccan Equestrian Federation (FRSME). There has been 21 registered moussems for 309 troupes in the year 2014.

 
Every year, about 330 Moroccan troupes compete for the Hassan II National Tbourida Trophy in El Jadida during the Week of the Horse promoted by the FRSME in Rabat, Morocco. They qualify for the finals through regionally organized competitions through the Federation and SOREC.

Tbourida was inscribed in the UNESCO Representative List of the Intangible Cultural Heritage of Humanity in 2021 during the 16th session of the Intergovernmental Committee for the Safeguarding of the Intangible Cultural Heritage, following an joint application filed in 2019 by the Ministry of Culture, the SOREC and 4 local Tbourida associations.

Moroccan artists such as Hassan El Glaoui have prolifically produced artwork featuring Moroccan riders and horses.

See also
 Mawsim

References

External links

 Morocco In Motion - Fantasia
Société Royale d’Encouragement du Cheval

Arab culture
Berber culture
Equestrian sports
Equestrian festivals
Maghreb
Moroccan culture
Tunisian culture
Algerian culture
Festivals in Algeria